Georgi Chakarov (born 13 January 1989) is a Bulgarian footballer who plays as a midfielder for Kariana Erden.

Career

Youth career
His first academy was PFC Rodopa Smolyan's youth team. In 2002, he played against Levski Sofia's youths and Georgi was noticed by Levski's scouts, which led to him finally joining the academy.

PFC Levski Sofia
Chakarov started playing for Levski's youth formations in 2002. He made his official debut for Levski Sofia's senior team on 18 October 2008 in a match against PFC Belasitsa Petrich. During the 2008/2009 season, Georgi was a part of Levski's second team, where he was one of the topscorers.

FC Sportist Svoge
On 27 June 2009 it was announced that Chakarov would be play on loan for FC Sportist Svoge during the first half of 2009/2010 season. The right winger played 4 matches for Sportist.

Chernomorets Pomorie
On 20 January 2010, Chakarov was loaned to Chernomorets Pomorie until early December 2011.

Spartak Pleven
In January 2017, Chakarov joined Spartak Pleven. He was released at the end of the season.

Hebar
In July 2017, Chakarov moved to Hebar Pazardzhik.

Return to Spartak Pleven
In January 2018, Chakarov returned to Spartak Pleven, taking part in the pre-season training.  He left the club at the end of the season.

Enosi Lerna and Chalkida
In the summer 2018, Chakarov joined Enosi Lerna FC and played there until the end of January 2019, where he signed with Chalkida FC.

Club career statistics
This statistic includes domestic league, domestic cup and European tournaments.

Last update: 13 December 2015

Trivia
 His favourite team abroad is Borussia Dortmund
 Chakarov's favourite footballer is Tomáš Rosický

References

External links
 Interview of Chakarov aged 17
 Profile at Levskisofia.info 
 

Bulgarian footballers
1989 births
Living people
People from Smolyan
First Professional Football League (Bulgaria) players
Second Professional Football League (Bulgaria) players
PFC Levski Sofia players
FC Sportist Svoge players
FC Pomorie players
FC Lyubimets players
FC Oborishte players
FC Dunav Ruse players
Neftochimic Burgas players
PFC Spartak Pleven players
FC Hebar Pazardzhik players
FC Kariana Erden players
Association football midfielders